Gavit is a Hindic surname that may refer to
Vijaykumar Gavit, Indian politician 
Heena Gavit, Indian politician 
Rajendra Gavit, Indian politician
Nirmala Gavit, Indian politician
Manjula Gavit, Indian politician
Manikrao Gavit, Indian politician

See also
 court case